Artur Mroczka (born 2 November 1989 in Poland) is a motorcycle speedway rider from Poland.

Career
He was a member of the Poland U-21 national team. In 2008, he won the Team U-21 World Championship, Individual U-19 European Championship and Polish Bronze Helmet (U-19). In 2009 he again won the Team U-21 World Championship title with Poland.

Results

Speedway Grand Prix

World Championships 
 Individual World Championship (Speedway Grand Prix)
 2010 - one heat in the Toruń SGP
 Individual U-21 World Championship
 2009 - 16th place in Semi-Final 2
 Team U-21 World Championship
 2008 -  Holsted - U-21 World Champion (9 points)
 2009 -  Gorzów Wlkp. - U-21 World Champion (11 pts)

European Championships 
 Individual U-19 European Championship
 2008 -  Stralsund - European Champion (13 points)

Domestic competitions 
 Individual Polish Championship
 2009 - 9th place in Quarter-Final 1
 Individual U-21 Polish Championship
 2007 - 12th place
 2008 -  Rybnik - 8th place (8 ps)
 2009 -  Leszno - 7th place (9 pts)
 Individual Latvian Championship
 2007 - 9th place (7 pts)
 Polish Silver Helmet (U-21):
 2008 - 14th place in Semi-Final 2 (3 pts)
 2009 -  Częstochowa - 7th place (9 pts)
 Polish Bronze Helmet (U-19)
 2008 -  Gdańsk - Winner (13 pts)

See also 
 Poland national speedway team

References 

1989 births
Living people
Polish speedway riders
Team Speedway Junior World Champions
Individual Speedway Junior European Champions
People from Grudziądz
Belle Vue Aces riders
Poole Pirates riders
Sportspeople from Kuyavian-Pomeranian Voivodeship